Idris Ali is an Indian politician and a Member of Parliament for the 16th Lok Sabha from Basirhat, West Bengal. He won the 2014 Indian general election as an All India Trinamool Congress candidate.

Political career 
Ali started his political career with Indian National Congress. In the 2014 Indian general election, he was elected as a member of parliament from the Basirhat seat on an All India Trinamool Congress ticket. He won by a margin of 109,000 votes.

In January 2017, Ali lodged a police complaint for allegedly receiving a death threat in a phone call. He claimed that the caller was a Bengali from Dubai and had said that Ali would be killed for supporting the Trinamool Congress.

On 13 March 2019, Mamata Banerjee announced that Ali would not contest the upcoming general election.

Views 
Ali has likened party president and chief minister Mamata Banerjee to Mahatma Gandhi. He said that like Gandhi, Banerjee was "a symbol of communal harmony and peace". He has also equated Banerjee with the Hindu goddess Saraswati and the Christian missionary Mother Teresa for doing "developmental work".

Ali has also said that the state of West Bengal and the country would burn if Banerjee was arrested in connection to the Saradha Group financial scandal. However, his party's secretary general Partha Chatterjee said that the party did not support Ali's views.

After the Pathankot attack, Ali said that Prime Minister Narendra Modi had "links" with the terrorists. However, the spokesperson of the party Derek O'Brien said that Ali's comments were "not the view of the party".

Controversy 
Ali has been accused of inciting riots in the Park Circus area in 2007 while protesting against Bangladeshi author Taslima Nasreen. Though he was arrested and a charge sheet was filed against him, he was released on bail.

References

India MPs 2014–2019
People from Basirhat
Lok Sabha members from West Bengal
Living people
1950 births
St. Paul's Cathedral Mission College alumni
University of Calcutta alumni
Trinamool Congress politicians from West Bengal